LPHS may refer to:

High schools

United States
 Lake Park High School, Medinah, Illinois
 LaPorte High School (Indiana), La Porte, Indiana
 LaSalle-Peru High School, La Salle, Illinois
 Lake Park High School, Roselle, Illinois
 Las Plumas High School, Oroville, California
 Lewis-Palmer High School, Monument, Colorado
 Lincoln Park High School (Chicago, Illinois)
 Lincoln Park High School (Lincoln Park, Michigan)
 Lone Peak High School, Highland, Utah
 La Plata High School, La Plata, Maryland

Other countries
 Leyte Progressive High School, Tacloban, Philippines
 Lindsay Place High School, Pointe-Claire, Quebec

Medicine 
 Loin pain hematuria syndrome